The SSV Tole Mour was a  schooner and sail training vessel operating in the Channel Islands of California, off the West Coast of the United States.

Designed by Ewbank, Brooke and Associates, she was built by the Nichols Bros. Boat Builders on Whidbey Island in Washington's Puget Sound to withstand the extreme conditions of the South Pacific, she is extremely seaworthy and meets or exceeds all of the United States Coast Guard's regulations as a Sailing School Vessel, while offering luxurious accommodations in comparison to other tall ships.  At 229 gross registered tons she is the largest active tall ship on the West Coast.

The Tole Mour was originally commissioned by the Marimed Foundation of Hawai’i in 1988 as a self-contained primary health care support vessel, operating in the US trust territory protectorate of the Marshall Islands. The name of the ship was selected by a competition of Marshall Islands school children, and means 'A Gift of Life and Health' in the Marshallese language. With onboard medical, dental and ophthalmological offices, the Tole Mour provided medical services to over 15,000 islanders over a period of 4 years, until the Marshallese government commissioned their own fleet of medical delivery vessels and the Tole Mour returned to Hawai’i to serve other purposes.

In 2001, she was acquired Guided Discoveries' Catalina Island Marine Institute, offering sail training, oceanography and marine biology education to hundreds of school-aged participants a year.  The professional crew was housed in up into 6 double cabins and 2 master rooms within her 123 feet on deck and  beam.  Up to 36 youth participants could be accommodated in cabins housing 4, 8 and 10 berths.  Her previous medical requirements provided areas for laboratory equipment, touch tanks, and aquariums.

In 2014, the Tole Mour was sold to Island Windjammers, a charter cruise company operating in the Caribbean Sea.  She underwent a refitting, as well as a name change, and is now known as Vela.

See also
 List of schooners

References

External links
CIMI Tallship Expeditions
Marimed Foundation
Marshall Islands Archive Entry on the Tole Mour
The American Sail Training Association
Ewbank Naval Architects formerly Ewbank Brooke & Associates

Schooners of the United States
Individual sailing vessels
Training ships
Sail training ships
Tall ships of the United States
Three-masted ships
1988 ships
Ships built in Washington (state)